Wolfgang Wehrum (1907–1971) was a German film editor and director. He edited the 1947 film In Those Days (1947), amongst the first German films tackling the country's recent Nazi past.

Selected filmography

Editor
 The Red Rider (1935)
 Flowers from Nice (1936)
 A Hoax (1936)
 The Irresistible Man (1937)
 Travelling People (1938)
 Diesel (1942)
The Master of the Estate (1943)
 Under the Bridges (1946)
 In Those Days (1947)
 The Original Sin (1948)
 Royal Children (1950)
 Hit Parade (1953)
 Southern Nights (1953)
 Spy for Germany (1956)
 It Happened Only Once (1958)
 Court Martial (1959)
 The Last Witness (1960)
 Three Men in a Boat (1961)
 The White Spider (1963)
 Lana, Queen of the Amazons (1964)
 Duel at Sundown (1965)

Assistant director
 Maria Ilona (1939)
 Under the Bridges (1946)
 Bombs on Monte Carlo (1960)

Director
 Artists' Blood (1949)

References

Bibliography 
 Langford, Michelle. Germany: Directory of World Cinema. Intellect Books, 2012.

External links 
 

1907 births
1971 deaths
Film people from Essen